Heruz-e Olya (also Romanized as Herūz-e ‘Olyā, Harūz-e ‘Olyā, and Haroozé Olya; also known as Harūz-e Bālā, Herūz Bālā, Herūz-e Bālā, Hurūs Bāla, and Hurūz Bāla) is a village in Heruz Rural District, Kuhsaran District, Ravar County, Kerman Province, Iran. At the 2006 census, its population was 270, in 73 families.

References 

Populated places in Ravar County